The Winona Church and School is a historic church on Rockhouse Road in Winona Township, Carroll County, Arkansas, USA. The building, a single story wood-frame structure with a gable roof, weatherboard siding, and modest Greek Revival styling, was built c. 1890 for use as both a school and a church, a common regional practice of the time. It originally had a small pyramidal belfry, but the bell was stolen and the belfry removed when the roof was replaced.  Other alterations include the replacement of the old stone piers with concrete piers as its foundation.

The building was listed on the National Register of Historic Places in 1991.

See also
National Register of Historic Places listings in Carroll County, Arkansas

References

Wooden churches in Arkansas
Schools in Arkansas
Churches on the National Register of Historic Places in Arkansas
School buildings on the National Register of Historic Places in Arkansas
Greek Revival church buildings in Arkansas
Churches completed in 1893
Buildings and structures in Carroll County, Arkansas
National Register of Historic Places in Carroll County, Arkansas